Chrysothrix xanthina is a widely distributed species of leprose lichen in the family Arthoniaceae. It has a bright yellow to bright greenish-yellow, thin, granular thallus, and typically grows on bark, although it is infrequently found growing on rock.

Taxonomy
It was first scientifically described by Finnish lichenologist Edvard August Vainio in 1901 as Lepraria xanthina. Klaus Kalb transferred it to the genus Chrysothrix in 2001. Kalb resurrected the species from synonymy with the lookalike Chrysothrix candelaris by virtue of its smaller granules and differences in chemistry: C. candelaris produces calycin, while C. xanthina makes pinastric acid. The granules made by C. xanthina are typically in the range 25–40 μm, while those of C. candelaris are 50–75 μm.

Habitat and distribution
Kalb originally considered Chrysothrix xanthina to be a tropical/subtropical species, although it is now known to have a wider range. It has been recorded from Africa (including Madagascar), Asia, Macaronesia, New South Wales, North America, and South America. Chrysothrix xanthina is widespread in eastern North America, where its range extends west to the eastern edge of the mixed grass prairie ecotone found in the Great Plains. It grows on both coniferous and hardwood trees. Rarely, it has been recorded growing on sheltered, somewhat shaded sandstone. In 2007, it was reported for the first time from Tasmania, Norfolk Island, and New Zealand.

References

Arthoniomycetes
Lichen species
Lichens described in 1901
Lichens of Africa
Lichens of Asia
Lichens of Australia
Lichens of New Zealand
Lichens of Macaronesia
Lichens of North America
Lichens of South America
Taxa named by Edvard August Vainio
Lichens of Madagascar